The 2016–17 season is the 45th season in AD Alcorcón ’s history.

Squad

Transfers
List of Spanish football transfers summer 2016#Alcorcón
List of Spanish football transfers winter 2016–17

Competitions

Overall

Liga

League table

Matches

Kickoff times are in CET.

Copa del Rey

Round of 32

|}

Round of 16

|}

Quarter-finals

|}

References

AD Alcorcón seasons
Alcorcón